The 162nd Massachusetts General Court, consisting of the Massachusetts Senate and the Massachusetts House of Representatives, met in 1961 and 1962 during the governorship of John Volpe. John E. Powers served as president of the Senate and John F. Thompson served as speaker of the House. In 1962, the General Court expanded the University of Massachusetts outside of the Amherst campus with the creation of the University of Massachusetts Medical School in Worcester.

Senators

Representatives

See also
 1962 Massachusetts gubernatorial election
 87th United States Congress
 List of Massachusetts General Courts

References

Further reading
 
 
 William M. Bulger. While the Music Lasts: My Life in Politics.  New York: Houghton Mifflin, 1996. .

External links

 
 
 
 
 

Political history of Massachusetts
Massachusetts legislative sessions
massachusetts
1961 in Massachusetts
massachusetts
1962 in Massachusetts